The Delphi Baptist Church, also known as Delphi Falls United Church, is a historic Baptist church located at Delphi Falls, New York, Onondaga County, New York.  It was built in 1815 and is the only surviving nearly-original church in Onondaga County surviving from the Federal period.  A very large, old, and well-lit church, it features large "twenty over twenty sash windows", consisting of 20 glass panes in each of upper and lower sashes.

It listed on the National Register of Historic Places on August 24, 1979.

Gallery

References

External links

Churches on the National Register of Historic Places in New York (state)
Historic American Buildings Survey in New York (state)
Churches completed in 1815
19th-century Baptist churches in the United States
Churches in Onondaga County, New York
National Register of Historic Places in Onondaga County, New York